William Yonge or Young (died c.1437) was an Irish cleric and judge, who held office as Lord Chancellor of Ireland.

He was appointed Archdeacon of Meath and parson of the parish of St. Columba's, Kells, which was attached to the  Archdeaconry, in 1412. In 1415 the Crown pardoned him for any illegal intrusions he had made into the lands attached to St. Columba's, and granted the right to him and to all his successors as Archdeacon to hold the lands in question quietly and without disturbance. In the same year John Young, presumably a close relative, was granted certain lands in County Meath  formerly held by William.

He was Lord Chancellor of Ireland sometime between 1418 and 1422; as so often in this period there is confusion over the precise dates on which he held office. His tenure as Lord Chancellor seems to have been brief. However he clearly had enough knowledge of the law to be subsequently appointed one of the justices and Keepers of the Peace for County Meath in 1426.

In 1430 the Crown granted him custody of the manor of Portlester in Meath during the minority of the heir, Richard, Duke of York.In 1435 he objected to the appointment of Robert Dyke, Archdeacon of Dublin, as rector of St. Patrick's Church, Trim, County Meath (now Trim Cathedral). Yonge had his own candidate, John Ardagh, one of his chaplains, but the Crown preferred Dyke, who had an exceptionally long and distinguished career as a public servant, culminating in his appointment as Lord Treasurer of Ireland.

Yonge's date of death has been given as 1437, but this is uncertain.

Lord chancellors of Ireland

Sources
Ball, F. Elrington The Judges in Ireland 1221-1921 London John Murray 1926
Potterton, Michael The Archaeology and History of Medieval Trim, County Meath Ph.D Thesis National University of Ireland  Maynooth 2003

Notes